The International Journal of Oncology is a monthly peer-reviewed medical journal of oncology, published by Spandidos Publications. It was established in 1992 and the editor-in-chief is Demetrios A. Spandidos (University of Crete). According to the Journal Citation Reports, the journal has a 2020 impact factor of 5.650.

References

External links 
 

Oncology journals
Publications established in 1992
English-language journals
Monthly journals
Spandidos Publications academic journals